General elections were held in the Netherlands on 22 January 2003.

Background
The election was held following the resignation of the first Balkenende cabinet on 16 October 2002 after conflicts attributed to the LPF, the new party of the already deceased Pim Fortuyn.

In the early days of the campaign the CDA of incumbent prime minister Jan Peter Balkenende and the VVD, the smallest coalition party, saw a major lead.

After TV debates the PvdA (which had experienced a landslide defeat in the 2002 general election) of opposition leader Wouter Bos caught up, overtaking the VVD and regaining some of the territory lost in the previous election. The PvdA also held a leadership election which got the party considerable attention.

Results

The LPF lost as spectacularly as it won in 2002, with its seat count dropping from 26 to 8. Commentators attributed the result to voters feeling that the LPF had become rudderless without its original leader and that the government had already implemented some of its policies, but argued disaffected LPF supporters would still back an "anti-establishment" party if a viable option was available. 

The exciting race of which party would become the largest was eventually won by the CDA, which went from 43 to 44 seats, ensuring a continuation of Balkenende's career as prime minister.

Most of the smaller parties on both the left and right side did not experience significant changes. Several other parties (among them Leefbaar Nederland, a 2002 newcomer) didn't manage to get over the threshold and thus gained no seats. They are not listed here.

After severe disagreements had frustrated the formation of a CDA-PvdA cabinet, a CDA-VVD-D66 cabinet was formed on 27 May 2003, with Balkenende as prime minister.

By province

Further reading

References

2003
2003 elections in the Netherlands
January 2003 events in Europe